State Road 220 (NM 220) is a  state highway in the US state of New Mexico. NM 220's western terminus is at NM 48 northwest of Alto, and the eastern terminus is at U.S. Route 380 (US 380) east of Capitan.

Major intersections

See also

References

220
Transportation in Lincoln County, New Mexico